{{DISPLAYTITLE:C8H14O}}
The molecular formula C8H14O (molar mass: 126.20 g/mol, exact mass: 126.1045 u) may refer to:

 Cyclooctanone
 Filbertone
 Oct-1-en-3-one, or 1-octen-3-one
 Sulcatone, or 6-methyl-5-hepten-2-one

Molecular formulas